Vassurány is a village in Vas county, Hungary. with a Population of 837.

References

Populated places in Vas County